Warren H. Orr (November 5, 1888 – January 12, 1962) was an American jurist.

Born in Hannibal, Missouri, Orr received his bachelor's degree from University of Missouri and his law degree from the University of Missouri School of Law. He worked in the newspaper business while in college. Orr was admitted to the Illinois and Missouri bars. He practiced law in Quincy, Illinois, then in Hamilton, Illinois, and Carthage, Illinois. He served as city attorney for Hamilton, Illinois and county judge for Hancock County, Illinois. From 1930 until 1939, Orr served in the Illinois Supreme Court. He then practiced law in Chicago, Illinois and was a Democratic candidate for Governor of Illinois losing to Adlai Stevenson in 1948. Orr died in Evanston, Illinois.

Notes

1888 births
1962 deaths
People from Quincy, Illinois
People from Hannibal, Missouri
University of Missouri alumni
University of Missouri School of Law alumni
Journalists from Missouri
Missouri lawyers
Illinois Democrats
Illinois state court judges
20th-century American judges
Journalists from Illinois
People from Carthage, Illinois
People from Hamilton, Illinois
Justices of the Illinois Supreme Court
20th-century American lawyers